Anton Widiastanto (born in Yogyakarta, January 30, 1979 ; age 41 years old) is a former drummer of one of Indonesia's top bands, Sheila on 7. While still joined in the band, Anton held the position as drummer, Anton has been asked to sign resignation contract that he never made, after he came back from Malaysia for Motor GP show. Sheila on 7 after eight years, on 18 October 2004.

He began his music career with the debut album Sheila on 7 (1999), which was followed by four albums Kisah Klasik Untuk Masa Depan (2000), Anugerah Terindah Yang Pernah Kumiliki (2000, Released in Malaysia and Singapore), 07 Des (2002), Ost. 30 Hari Mencari Cinta (2003) and Pejantan Tangguh (2004). After leaving Sheila on 7, he resumed his plan to build a music studio.

References

Indonesian pop musicians
Indonesian rock musicians
Anugerah Musik Indonesia winners
1979 births
Living people